Md. Suzauddaulah is a Jatiya Party (Ershad) politician and the former Member of Parliament of Naogaon-3.

Career
Suzauddaulah was elected to parliament from Naogaon-3 as a Jatiya Party candidate in 1988.

References

Jatiya Party politicians
Living people
4th Jatiya Sangsad members
Year of birth missing (living people)
People from Naogaon District